Mound Landing is a ghost town in Bolivar County, Mississippi, United States.

The settlement was located at Choctaw Bend on the Mississippi River.

History

The area was settled in 1840 by William P. Perkins, who used slave labor to clear  of canebrakes on which he established Mound Plantation, a cotton plantation.

Mound Plantation and its river landing were named for three nearby Indian mounds.

Perkins eventually owned  of land at the settlement and, by 1850, was Bolivar County's largest land owner and one of the United States' largest slaveholders.

Mound Landing had a post office as early as 1880.

In 1886, the population of Mound Landing was 50.

A levee was erected in 1867 to protect the settlement from river flooding. The levee was locally financed, and subsequent improvements to the levee were made. A ferry landing was located at the settlement, with a ramp which permitted vehicles to pass over the top of the levee.

In April 1927, as water levels on the Mississippi River began to rise due to heavy rains, an unknown number of Negro prisoners were brought in chains to Mound Landing by the National Guard to fill sandbags at gunpoint in an effort to reinforce the levee. On April 21, the levee at Mound Landing broke, killing at least 100 prisoners and carrying their bodies several miles from the settlement. The Great Mississippi Flood of 1927 was one of the most damaging floods in the United States, inundating  of land in the Mississippi Delta, taking 246 lives, and displacing 700,000 people.

All that remains at Mound Landing is a boatramp located on private property owned by a hunting club.

Notable person
 J. E. Halbert, member of the Mississippi House of Representatives (1888–1889) and Surgeon General for Mississippi (1889–1892).

References

Former populated places in Bolivar County, Mississippi
Former populated places in Mississippi
Mississippi populated places on the Mississippi River
Ghost towns in Mississippi